WKNX may refer to:

 WKNX-TV, a television station (channel 7) licensed to serve Knoxville, Tennessee, United States
 WEYI-TV, a television station (channel 25), formerly using the call letters as channel 57 from 1953-1972 licensed to serve Flint/Tri-Cities market, Michigan, United States
 WKNX-LD, a low-power television station (channel 22) licensed to serve Pinconning, Michigan, United States
 WJMK (AM), a radio station (1250 AM) licensed to Bridgeport, Michigan, which held the call sign WKNX 1997 to 2004
 WJNL, a radio station (1210 AM) which held the call sign WKNX from 1947 to 1997, while it was licensed to Saginaw, Michigan